Events from the year 1917 in Ireland.

Events
25 January – armed merchantman  sunk by mines off Lough Swilly; 354 killed of 475 aboard.
3 February – Count George Noble Plunkett, father of Joseph Mary Plunkett, wins Roscommon North on an abstentionist Sinn Féin platform.
7 March – David Lloyd George announces that Britain is ready to confer self-government to the parts of Ireland that want it. The north-eastern part will not be "coerced".
12 March – in the British House of Commons, J. P. Farrell proposes that Ireland be excluded from the operation of the National Services Act.
20 March – a motion to reduce the salary of the British prime minister by £100 is introduced in the British House of Commons as a protest against the refusal to publish the proceedings of the 1916 Rising courts martial.

10 May – Sinn Féin candidate Joseph McGuinness wins a by-election in South Longford against the Irish Parliamentary Party's candidate McKenna. It is a political disaster for John Redmond and his Party.
16 May – British prime minister, David Lloyd George, announces that he wants immediate Home Rule for the 26 counties. Six north-eastern counties are to be excluded for a period of five years.
7–14 June – at the Battle of Messines on the Western Front (World War I), 36th (Ulster) Division and 16th (Irish) Division both fight within IX Corps of the British Army.
18 June – prisoners taken during the Easter Rising, released under an amnesty, arrive at Kingstown (Dún Laoghaire) by mailboat.
10 July – Éamon de Valera of Sinn Féin beats Patrick Lynch, at this time an Irish Parliamentary Party Home Rule candidate, in the East Clare by-election caused by the death on active service of Willie Redmond. One Dublin Castle official calls it 'the most important election that has ever taken place, or ever will, in Irish history.'
16 July – the Round Room in the Mansion House, Dublin, is filled to capacity as the leaders of Sinn Féin demand the bodies of the Easter Rising leaders so that they can be given a Christian burial.
25 July – large crowds assemble at College Green in Dublin as the Irish Convention meets for the first time.
 August – W. T. Cosgrave elected for Sinn Féin in a by-election in Kilkenny.
10 September – Imperial German Navy U-boat  is sunk in Cork Harbour, probably by one of her own mines, with the loss of 26 crew.
25 October – 1,700 Sinn Féin delegates attend a convention in the Mansion House and De Valera replaces Arthur Griffith as the organisation's president.
17 November – Action of 17 November 1917: Queenstown-based United States Navy destroyers  and  capture Imperial German Navy U-boat  which is scuttled off Kinsale.
Two days later her sister, SS Coningbeg, making the same passage is sunk nearby by the same German submarine with the loss of all 15 crew.
Undated – Scoil Bhríde, Ranelagh, founded as the first gaelscoil (Irish-language school).

Arts and literature
 May – W. B. Yeats acquires Thoor Ballylee near Gort.
 August – Anglo-Welsh composer Philip Heseltine begins a year's stay in Ireland.
 Austin Clarke's narrative poem The Vengeance of Fionn is published.
 Francis Ledwidge's poems Songs of Peace are published posthumously.
 Annie M. P. Smithson's first novel Her Irish Heritage is published.
 The first feature film made in Ireland, A Girl of Glenbeigh, starring Kathleen O'Connor, is made by the Film Company of Ireland.

Sport

Football
Irish League
Winners: Glentoran
Irish Cup
Winners: Glentoran 2–0 Belfast Celtic

Gaelic Games
Football
Senior Football Championship
Winners: Wexford
Wexford 0–9 : 0–5 Clare
Hurling
Senior Hurling Championship
Winners: Dublin
Dublin (Collegians) 5–4 : 4–2 Tipperary (Boherlahan)

Births
1 January? – Margaret Barry, traditional singer (died 1989).
6 January – Maeve Brennan, short story writer and journalist (died 1993 in the United States).
15 February – Ruairi Brugha, Fianna Fáil TD, Member of the European Parliament, member of the Seanad (died 2006).
18 February – John Keane, Waterford hurler (died 1975).
3 March – Dave P. Tyndall, Jr., businessman (died 2006).
17 March – Brian Boydell, composer, professor of music at Trinity College Dublin (died 2000).
23 March – Josef Locke, born Joseph McLaughlin, tenor (died 1999).
27 March – Harry West, leader of the Ulster Unionist Party from 1974 to 1979, Stormont MP, Minister for Agriculture (died 2004).
6 April – Jimmy Phelan, Kilkenny hurler (died 2006).
9 April – Vincent O'Brien, race horse trainer (died 2009).
14 April – Valerie Hobson, actress (died 1998).
29 April – Paddy Ruschitzko, Laois hurler (died 2004).
2 May – Con Cottrell, Cork hurler (died 1982).
5 May – Jimmy Murray, Roscommon Gaelic footballer and All-Ireland winning captain (died 2007).
25 May – Havelock Nelson, composer and pianist (died 1996).
17 June – Michael Moynihan, Labour Party Senator and TD (died 2001).
21 July – Simon Curley, cricketer (died 1989).
15 August – Jack Lynch, Taoiseach and leader of Fianna Fáil (died 1999).
1 October – Cahal Daly, Cardinal, Archbishop of Armagh (died 2009).
15 October – Kevin Boland, Fianna Fáil TD, served as Minister for Defence, Minister for Social Welfare and Minister for Local Government (died 2001).
1 November – Michael O'Higgins, Fine Gael TD and Senator (died 2005).
3 November – Conor Cruise O'Brien, newspaper editor, author, diplomat, Labour Party Teachta Dála and Cabinet Minister, Member of the European Parliament (died 2008).
11 November – Michael O'Riordan, veteran of the Spanish Civil War and founder of the Communist Party of Ireland (died 2006).
27 December – Jimmy McAlinden, footballer and football manager (died 1993).
Full date unknown – Paddy Grace, Kilkenny hurler (died 1984).

Deaths
30 January – John McDonald, soldier and Congressman in America (born 1837).
2 April – John Phillips, Member of Parliament for South Longford.
17 April – Jane Barlow, poet and novelist (born 1857).
6 May – Thomas Joseph Carr, second Roman Catholic Archbishop of Melbourne, Australia (born 1839).
10 May – Daniel Joseph Sheehan, Royal Naval Air Service and Royal Flying Corps pilot in World War I, killed in action (born 1894).
9 June – William Hoey Kearney Redmond, nationalist politician, barrister, brother of John Redmond, killed in Battle of Messines (born 1861).
31 July – Francis Ledwidge, poet, killed in action during World War I (born 1887).
25 September – Thomas Ashe, took part in the Easter Rising, died following forcible feeding while on hunger strike (born 1885).
4 October – Dave Gallaher, rugby player for New Zealand, killed at Passchendaele (born 1873).
6 December – James Samuel Emerson, soldier, posthumous recipient of the Victoria Cross for gallantry in 1917 on the Hindenburg Line north of La Vacquerie, France (born 1895).
12 December – Charles Bowen, politician in New Zealand (born 1830).
27 December – William John Hennessy, artist (born 1839).

References 

 
1910s in Ireland
Ireland
Years of the 20th century in Ireland
Ireland